Christophe Lebon (born 8 November 1982 in Pontoise, France) is a French swimmer who specialises in the 100 meter butterfly and the 200 meter butterfly. Lebon competed at the 2008 Summer Olympics.

References

1982 births
Olympic swimmers of France
Swimmers at the 2008 Summer Olympics
Living people
French male butterfly swimmers
People from Pontoise